Arrhenophaninae is a subfamily of moths in family Psychidae. It was once recognised as a family, but has been found deeply nested in Psychidae in phylogenetic studies.

Genera
 Arrhenophanes
 Cnissostages
 Dysoptus
 Notiophanes
 Palaeophanes

The genus Parameristis with the species Parameristis eremaea is now considered to be a Psychidae species in the genus Lamyristis.

References

External links

https://apnahindi.in/concealer-kya-kaam-karta-hai-ghar-par-concealer-kayse-banaye-in-hindi/
Arrhenophanidae
In-depth study of the family Arrhenophanidae

 
Moth families